The following is a list of science podcasts.

List

See also 
 Science communication
 Science journalism
 Popular science
 Nature documentary

References 

Science
Science podcasts
Science-related lists